United Ireland, also referred to as Irish reunification, is the proposition that all of Ireland should be a single sovereign state. At present, the island is divided politically; the sovereign Republic of Ireland has jurisdiction over the majority of Ireland, while Northern Ireland, which lies entirely within (but does not constitute the entirety of) the Irish province of Ulster, is part of the United Kingdom. Achieving a united Ireland is a central tenet of Irish nationalism, particularly of both mainstream and dissident Irish republican political and paramilitary organisations. Unionists support Northern Ireland remaining part of the United Kingdom, and therefore oppose Irish unification.

Ireland has been partitioned since May 1921, when the implementation of the Government of Ireland Act 1920 created the state of Northern Ireland within the United Kingdom. The Anglo-Irish Treaty, which led to the establishment in December 1922 of a dominion called the Irish Free State, recognised partition, but this was opposed by anti-Treaty republicans. When the anti-Treaty Fianna Fáil party came to power in the 1930s, it adopted a new constitution which claimed sovereignty over the entire island. The Irish Republican Army (IRA) had a united Ireland as its goal during the conflict with British security forces and loyalist paramilitaries from the 1960s to the 1990s known as The Troubles. The Good Friday Agreement signed in 1998, which ended the conflict, acknowledged the legitimacy of the desire for a united Ireland, while declaring that it could be achieved only with the consent of a majority of the people of Northern Ireland.

In 2016, Sinn Féin called for a referendum on a united Ireland following the decision by the United Kingdom to leave the European Union (EU). The decision had increased the perceived likelihood of a united Ireland, in order to avoid the possible requirement for a hard border between Northern Ireland and the Republic of Ireland, though the imposition of a hard border did not eventuate. Taoiseach Enda Kenny said that in the event of reunification, Northern Ireland should be allowed to rejoin the EU, just as East Germany was permitted to join the EU's predecessor institutions by reuniting with the rest of Germany after the fall of the Berlin Wall.

In demographic terms, Northern Ireland was created to contain a majority of Ulster Protestants, who almost all favour continued union with Great Britain, and did so for most of its history. Four of the six counties have Irish Catholic majorities and majorities voting for Irish nationalist parties, and Catholics have become the plurality in Northern Ireland as of 2021. The religious denominations of the citizens of Northern Ireland are only a guide to likely political preferences, as there are both Protestants who favour a united Ireland, and Catholics who support the union. Surveys identify a significant number of Catholics who favour the continuation of the union without identifying themselves as Unionists or British.

Legal basis
Article 3.1 of the Constitution of Ireland "recognises that a united Ireland shall be brought about only by peaceful means with the consent of a majority of the people, democratically expressed, in both jurisdictions in the island". This provision was introduced in 1999 after implementation of the Good Friday Agreement, as part of replacing the old Articles 2 and 3, which had laid a direct claim to the whole island as the national territory.

The Northern Ireland Act 1998, a statute of the Parliament of the United Kingdom, provides that Northern Ireland will remain within the United Kingdom unless a majority of the people of Northern Ireland vote to form part of a united Ireland. It specifies that the Secretary of State for Northern Ireland "shall exercise the power [to hold a referendum] if at any time it appears likely to him that a majority of those voting would express a wish that Northern Ireland should cease to be part of the United Kingdom and form part of a united Ireland". Such referendums may not take place within seven years of each other.

The Northern Ireland Act 1998 supersedes previous similar legislative provisions. The Northern Ireland Constitution Act 1973 also provided that Northern Ireland remained part of the United Kingdom unless a majority voted otherwise in a referendum, while under the Ireland Act 1949 the consent of the Parliament of Northern Ireland was needed for a united Ireland. In 1985, the Anglo-Irish Agreement affirmed that any change in the status of Northern Ireland would only come about with the consent of a majority of the people of Northern Ireland.

History

Home Rule, resistance and the Easter Rising

The Kingdom of Ireland as a whole had become part of the United Kingdom of Great Britain and Ireland under the Acts of Union 1800. From the 1870s, support for some form of an elected parliament in Dublin grew. In 1870, Isaac Butt, who was a Protestant, formed the Home Government Association, which became the Home Rule League. Charles Stewart Parnell, also a Protestant, became leader in 1880, and the organisation became the Irish National League in 1882. Despite the religion of its early leaders, its support was strongly associated with Irish Catholics. In 1886, Parnell formed a parliamentary alliance with Liberal Party Prime Minister William Ewart Gladstone and secured the introduction of the First Home Rule Bill. This was opposed by the Conservative Party and led to a split in the Liberal Party. Opposition in Ireland was concentrated in the heavily Protestant counties in Ulster. The difference in religious background was a legacy of the Ulster Plantation in the early seventeenth century. In 1893, the Second Home Rule Bill passed in the House of Commons, but was defeated in the House of Lords, where the Conservatives dominated. A Third Home Rule Bill was introduced in 1912, and in September 1912, just under half a million men and women signed the Ulster Covenant to swear they would resist its application in Ulster. The Ulster Volunteer Force were formed in 1913 as a militia to resist Home Rule.

The Government of Ireland Act 1914 (previously known as the Third Home Rule Bill) provided for a unitary devolved Irish Parliament, a culmination of several decades of work from the Irish Parliamentary Party. It was signed into law in September 1914 in the midst of the Home Rule Crisis and at the outbreak of the First World War. On the same day, the Suspensory Act 1914 suspended its actual operation.

In 1916, a group of revolutionaries led by the Irish Republican Brotherhood launched the Easter Rising, during which they issued a Proclamation of the Irish Republic. The rebellion was not successful and sixteen of the leaders were executed. The small separatist party Sinn Féin became associated with the Rising in its aftermath as several of those involved in it were party members.

The Irish Convention held between 1917 and 1918 sought to reach agreement on manner in which home rule would be implemented after the war. All Irish parties were invited, but Sinn Féin boycotted the proceedings. By the end of the First World War, a number of moderate unionists came to support Home Rule, believing that it was the only way to keep a united Ireland in the United Kingdom. The Irish Dominion League opposed partition of Ireland into separate southern and northern jurisdictions, while arguing that the whole of Ireland should be granted dominion status with the British Empire.

At the 1918 election Sinn Féin won 73 of the 105 seats; however, there was a strong regional divide, with the Ulster Unionist Party (UUP) winning 23 of the 38 seats in Ulster. Sinn Féin had run on a manifesto of abstaining from the United Kingdom House of Commons, and from 1919 met in Dublin as Dáil Éireann. At its first meeting, the Dáil adopted the Declaration of Independence of the Irish Republic, a claim which it made in respect of the entire island. Supporters of this Declaration fought in the Irish War of Independence.

Two jurisdictions
During this period, the Government of Ireland Act 1920 repealed the previous 1914 Act, and provided for two separate devolved parliaments in Ireland. It defined Northern Ireland as "the parliamentary counties of Antrim, Armagh, Down, Fermanagh, Londonderry and Tyrone, and the parliamentary boroughs of Belfast and Londonderry" and Southern Ireland "so much of Ireland as is not comprised within the said parliamentary counties and boroughs". Section 3 of this Act provided that the parliaments may be united by identical acts of parliament:

Sinn Féin did not recognise this act, treating elections to the respective parliaments as a single election to the Second Dáil. While the Parliament of Northern Ireland sat from 1921 to 1972, the Parliament of Southern Ireland was suspended after its first meeting was boycotted by the Sinn Féin members, who comprised 124 of its 128 MPs. 
A truce in the War of Independence was called in July 1921, followed by negotiations in London between the government of the United Kingdom and a Sinn Féin delegation. On 6 December 1921, they signed the Anglo-Irish Treaty, which led to the establishment of the Irish Free State the following year, a dominion within the British Empire.

With respect to Northern Ireland, Articles 11 and 12 of the Treaty made special provision for it including as follows:

The Prime Minister of Northern Ireland, Sir James Craig, speaking in the House of Commons of Northern Ireland in October 1922 said that "when 6 December [1922] is passed the month begins in which we will have to make the choice either to vote out or remain within the Free State". He said it was important that that choice be made as soon as possible after 6 December 1922 "in order that it may not go forth to the world that we had the slightest hesitation". On 7 December 1922, the day after the establishment of the Irish Free State, the Houses of the Parliament of Northern Ireland resolved to make the following address to the King so as to exercise the rights conferred on Northern Ireland under Article 12 of the Treaty:

The King received it the following day. These steps cemented Northern Ireland's legal separation from the Irish Free State.

In Irish republican legitimist theory, the Treaty was illegitimate and could not be approved. According to this theory, the Second Dáil did not dissolve and members of the Republican Government remained as the legitimate government of the Irish Republic declared in 1919. Adherents to this theory rejected the legitimacy of both the Irish Free State and Northern Ireland.

The report of Boundary Commission in 1925 established under the Treaty did not lead to any alteration in the border.

Within Northern Ireland, the Nationalist Party was an organisational successor to the Home Rule Movement, and advocated the end of partition. It had a continuous presence in the Northern Ireland Parliament from 1921 to 1972, but was in permanent opposition to the UUP government.

A new Constitution of Ireland was proposed by Éamon de Valera in 1937 and approved by the voters of the Irish Free State (thereafter simply Ireland). Articles 2 and 3 of this Constitution claimed the whole island of Ireland as the national territory, while claiming legal jurisdiction only over the previous territory of the Irish Free State.

Article 15.2 allowed for the "creation or recognition of subordinate legislatures and for the powers and functions of these legislatures", which would have allowed for the continuation of the Parliament of Northern Ireland within a unitary Irish state.

In 1946, former Prime Minister Winston Churchill told the Irish High Commissioner to the United Kingdom, "I said a few words in Parliament the other day about your country because I still hope for a United Ireland. You must get those fellows in the north in, though; you can't do it by force. There is not, and never was, any bitterness in my heart towards your country." He later said, "You know I have had many invitations to visit Ulster but I have refused them all. I don't want to go there at all, I would much rather go to southern Ireland. Maybe I'll buy another horse with an entry in the Irish Derby."

Under the Republic of Ireland Act 1948, Ireland declared that the country may officially be described as the Republic of Ireland and that the President of Ireland had the executive authority of the state in its external relations. This was treated by the British Commonwealth as ending Irish membership. In response, the United Kingdom passed the Ireland Act 1949. Section 1(2) of this act affirmed the provision in the Treaty that the position of Ireland remained a matter for the Parliament of Northern Ireland:

Between 1956 and 1962, the IRA engaged in a border campaign against British Army and Royal Ulster Constabulary outposts with the aim of ending British rule in Northern Ireland. This coincided with brief electoral success of Sinn Féin, which won four seats at the 1957 Irish general election. This was its first electoral success since 1927, and it did not win seats in the Republic of Ireland again until 1997. The border campaign was entirely unsuccessful in its aims. In 1957, Prime Minister Harold Macmillan wrote that "I do not think that a United Ireland - with de Valera as a kind of Irish Nehru would do us much good. Let us stand by our friends."

Calls for unification, start of the Troubles

The Northern Ireland civil rights movement emerged in 1967 to campaign for civil rights for Catholics in Northern Ireland. Tensions between republican and loyalist groups in the north erupted into outright violence in the late 1960s. In 1968 the Irish Prime Minister Jack Lynch raised the issue of partition in London: "It has been the aim of my government and its predecessors to promote the reunification of Ireland by fostering a spirt of brotherhood among all sections of the Irish people. The clashes in the streets of Derry are an expression of the evils which partition has brought in its train." He later stated to the press that the ending of partition would be "a just and inevitable solution to the problems of Northern Ireland."

Lynch renewed his call to end partition in August 1969 when he proposed negotiations with Britain with the hope of merging the Irish Republic and Northern Ireland into a federal type state. Lynch proposed that the two parliaments continue to function with a Council of Ireland having authority over the entire country. The Prime Minister of Northern Ireland James Chichester-Clark rejected the proposal. In August 1971 Lynch proposed that the Government of Northern Ireland (Stormont) be replaced with an administration that would share power with Catholics. The next day the Northern Prime Minister Brian Faulkner rejected Lynch's statement and stated that "no further attempt by us to deal constructively with the present Dublin government is possible." Later in 1971 British Labor Party leader (and future Prime Minister) Harold Wilson proposed a plan that would lead to a united Ireland after a 15-year transitional period. He called for the establishment of a commission that would examine the possibility of creating a united Ireland which would be agreed upon by all three parliaments. The northern Prime Minister rejected the proposal and reiterated the desire that Northern Ireland remain an integral part of the United Kingdom. The Irish Prime Minister indicated the possibility of amending the Irish constitution to accommodate the Protestants of Nothern Ireland and urged the British government to "declare its interest in encouraging the unity of Ireland".  

In 1969 the British government deployed troops in what would become the longest continuous deployment in British military history Operation Banner. The Provisional Irish Republican Army (IRA) had begun a thirty-year campaign against British security forces with the aim of winning a united Ireland.

In 1970, the Social Democratic and Labour Party (SDLP) was established to campaign for civil rights and a united Ireland by peaceful, constitutional means. The party rose to be the dominant party representing the nationalist community until the early twenty-first century.

In 1972, the parliament of Northern Ireland was suspended, and under the Northern Ireland Constitution Act 1973, it was formally abolished. Section 1 of the 1973 Act stated, 

A border poll was held in Northern Ireland in 1973. The SDLP and Sinn Féin called for a boycott of the poll. 98.9% of votes cast supported remaining part of the United Kingdom, accounting for 57.5% of the overall electorate.

In 1983, the Irish government led by Taoiseach Garret FitzGerald established the New Ireland Forum as a consultation on a new Ireland. Though all parties in Ireland were invited, the only ones to attend were Fine Gael, Fianna Fáil, the Labour Party and the SDLP. Its report considered three options: a unitary state, i.e., a united Ireland; a federal/confederal state; and joint sovereignty. These options were rejected by Prime Minister Margaret Thatcher. In 1985, the governments of Ireland and of the United Kingdom signed the Anglo-Irish Agreement; the British government accepted an advisory role for the Irish government in the future of Northern Ireland. Article 1 of the Agreement stated that the future constitutional position of Northern Ireland would be a matter for the people of Northern Ireland:

In the Downing Street Declaration, Taoiseach Albert Reynolds and Prime Minister John Major issued a joint statement, in which Major, "reiterated on behalf of the British Government, that they have no selfish strategic or economic interest in Northern Ireland".

Good Friday Agreement
The Good Friday Agreement in 1998 was a culmination of the peace process. The agreement acknowledged nationalism and unionism as "equally legitimate, political aspirations". In the Northern Ireland Assembly, all members would designate as Unionist, Nationalist, or Other, and certain measures would require cross-community support. The agreement was signed by the governments of Ireland and of the United Kingdom. In Northern Ireland, it was supported by all parties who were in the Northern Ireland Forum with the exception of the Democratic Unionist Party and the UK Unionist Party, and it was supported by all parties in the Oireachtas. It was also opposed by dissident republicans, including Republican Sinn Féin and the 32 County Sovereignty Movement. It was approved in referendums in Northern Ireland and in the Republic of Ireland.

Included in the Agreement were provisions which became part of the Northern Ireland Act 1998 on the form of a future referendum on a united Ireland.

On the establishment of the institutions in 1999, Articles 2 and 3 of the Constitution of Ireland were amended to read:

Brexit and the Northern Ireland Protocol

In a referendum in June 2016, England and Wales voted to leave the European Union. The majority of those voting in Northern Ireland and in Scotland, however, voted for the UK to remain. Of the parties in the Assembly, only the Democratic Unionist Party (DUP), the Traditional Unionist Voice (TUV) and People Before Profit (PBP) had campaigned for a Leave vote. Irish politicians began the discussion regarding possible changes to the border between Northern Ireland and the Republic of Ireland. The status and treatment of Northern Ireland and Gibraltar- the only parts of the United Kingdom which would have new land borders with the EU following the UK withdrawal, became important to the negotiations, along with access to the regional development assistance scheme (and new funding thereof) from the European Union.

Sinn Féin cited these concerns as the basis for new discussion on a united Ireland. These calls were rejected by the British government and Unionist politicians, with Theresa Villiers arguing that there was no evidence that opinion in Northern Ireland had shifted towards being in favour of a united Ireland. In the 2017 Assembly election, the DUP lost ten seats and came just one seat ahead of Sinn Féin. Sinn Féin used this opportunity to call for a Northern Ireland referendum on a united Ireland.

The Brexit Secretary, David Davis, confirmed to Mark Durkan, the SDLP MP for Foyle, that in the event of Northern Ireland becoming part of a united Ireland, "Northern Ireland would be in a position of becoming part of an existing EU member state, rather than seeking to join the EU as a new independent state." Enda Kenny pointed to the provisions that allowed East Germany to join the West and the EEC during the reunification of Germany as a precedent. In April 2017 the European Council acknowledged that, in the event of Irish unification, "the entire territory of such a united Ireland would [...] be part of the European Union." The SDLP manifesto for the 2017 UK general election called for a referendum on a united Ireland after the UK withdraws from the EU. However the Secretary of State for Northern Ireland at the time, James Brokenshire, said the conditions for a vote are "not remotely satisfied".

After the 2017 election, the UK government was reliant on confidence and supply from the Democratic Unionist Party. The deal supported the Conservative led government through the Brexit negotiation process. The 2020 Brexit withdrawal agreement included the Northern Ireland Protocol, which established different trade rules for the territory than Great Britain. While Northern Ireland would de jure leave the single market, it would still enforce all EU customs rules, while Britain would diverge. This would result in a regulatory "border in the Irish Sea" rather than a border between Northern Ireland and the Republic of Ireland, and caused fears from unionist politicians about Brexit causing a weakening of the UK.

The new UK prime minister Boris Johnson continued to claim no trade border would take form as late as August 2020, despite having negotiated its creation. Dominic Cummings later claimed that Johnson did not understand the deal at the time it was signed, while Ian Paisley Jr claimed that Johnson had privately promised to "tear up" the deal after it was agreed. In September, Johnson sought to unilaterally dis-apply parts of the Northern Ireland protocol, despite acknowledging that this broke international law. The bill was rejected by the House of Lords, resulting in several provisions being withdrawn before it passed in December 2020- shortly before the protocol was due to come into effect.

The implementation of the protocol, and the new regulatory hurdles had a negative effect on east–west trade, and drew strong condemnation from unionist figures, including DUP members such as First Minister Arlene Foster.  Staff making the required checks were threatened, resulting in a temporary suspension of checks at Larne and Belfast ports. In February 2021, several unionist parties began a legal challenge, alleging that the protocol violated the Act of Union 1800, the bill which had originally merged Ireland with the United Kingdom, as well as the Good Friday Agreement. The challenge was dismissed in June, with the court deciding that the protocol- and other legislation in the intervening 200 years- had effectively repealed parts of the Act of Union. On March 4, the Loyalist Communities Council withdrew its support for the peace agreement- while indicating that opposition to it should not be in the form of violence. Riots erupted in loyalist areas at the end of the month, continuing until 9 April. The protocol's implementation, and opposition within the DUP, resulted in the announcement of Foster's resignation on 28 April. The Irish Times interviewed loyalist Shankill Road residents that month and found significant anger at the DUP, and accusations that the community had been "sold short" on the protocol. Foster was replaced by Paul Givan later that year, though he too resigned in February 2022 over the continued existence of the protocol.

The UK government sought to re-negotiate the protocol, a prospect poorly received by EU leaders such as Emmanuel Macron. When discussing the effects of the protocol in June 2021, Leo Varadkar outlined a vision for a united Irish state with devolved representation in the North. He added "It should be part of our mission as a party to work towards it." In August 2021, Gerry Adams told the Irish Government that it should begin planning for a border poll and that one could happen within three years. Talks aimed at amending the customs checks required by the protocol began in October; though Maroš Šefčovič indicated that the protocol itself will not be re-negotiated. In December, the UK's chief negotiator Lord Frost resigned his post over "concerns about the current direction of travel".

Political positions on a united Ireland

Within the Northern Ireland Assembly, MLAs designate as Unionist, Nationalist or Other. The DUP (25 seats), the UUP (9 seats), the TUV (1 seat) and the Independent MLAs Claire Sugden and Alex Easton are designated as Unionist; Sinn Féin (which won 27 seats in the 2022 Northern Ireland Assembly election) and the SDLP (8 seats) are designated as Nationalist; the Alliance Party (17 seats) and PBP (1 seat) are designated as Other. However People Before Profit are in favour of Irish Unity.

There are a number of minor nationalist parties, including the Irish Republican Socialist Party, which supports a united socialist Irish state and is affiliated with the Irish National Liberation Army. Another such party, Republican Sinn Féin, linked to the Continuity IRA, maintain the Irish republican legitimist theory that neither state in Ireland is legitimate. Its Éire Nua (in English, New Ireland) policy advocates a unified federal state with regional governments for the four provinces and the national capital in Athlone. None of these parties has significant electoral support.

Within the Oireachtas, there has traditionally been broad support for a united Ireland, with differences over the twentieth century on how it would be achieved. This includes Sinn Féin, which has had seats in the Dáil since 1997. The initial party constitution of Fianna Fáil in 1926 under Éamon de Valera included as the first of its aims, "To secure the Unity and Independence of Ireland as a Republic". In 1937, de Valera proposed the Constitution of Ireland which laid claim to the whole island of Ireland. In the 1980s, led by Charles Haughey, the party opposed the consideration of options other than a unitary state in the New Ireland Forum Report and opposed the Anglo-Irish Agreement; this stance led in part to the Des O'Malley and Mary Harney leaving Fianna Fáil and establishing the Progressive Democrats, a party that lasted from 1985 to 2008. Fianna Fáil leaders Albert Reynolds and Bertie Ahern led Irish governments in favour of the Downing Street Declaration and the Good Friday Agreement respectively.

When formed in 1933, Fine Gael initially used the subtitle United Ireland. Fine Gael leader Garret FitzGerald convened the New Ireland Forum in 1983 and negotiated the Anglo-Irish Agreement. In the aftermath of the vote on Brexit, Enda Kenny sought assurances on the position of Northern Ireland in the case of a united Ireland. The Irish Labour Party has adopted a similar approach to Fine Gael in government to a united Ireland.

In a survey of TDs conducted by TheJournal.ie on support for a border poll and a united Ireland conducted in December 2016, only TDs from the Anti-Austerity Alliance (now Solidarity) stated they were opposed to a united Ireland at the present moment.

Of the British parties, the Conservative Party is explicitly unionist; it has formally been called the Conservative and Unionist Party since a merger with the Liberal Unionist Party in 1912. The UUP was affiliated with the National Union of Conservative and Unionist Associations until 1985. The Northern Ireland Conservatives are a minor unionist party in Northern Ireland.

Historically, there has been support for a united Ireland within the left of the British Labour Party, and in the 1980s it became official policy to support a united Ireland by consent. The policy of "unity by consent" continued into the 1990s, eventually being replaced by a policy of neutrality in line with the Downing Street Declaration. The former Labour leader Jeremy Corbyn supports a united Ireland, although he has said that it is "up for the Irish people to decide" whether to remain part of the UK. They do not organise electorally in Northern Ireland, respecting the SDLP as their sister party within the Party of European Socialists. Similarly, the Liberal Democrats co-operate with the Alliance Party and share their support of the Good Friday Agreement while expressing reservations about what they perceive as 'institutionalised sectarianism' in the agreement. Former Alliance leader Lord Alderdice is a member of the Liberal Democrats in the House of Lords. One supporter of a United Ireland in the Liberal Democrats was Michael Meadowcroft, MP for Leeds West between 1983 and 1987.

Northern Ireland opinion polling
This graph shows yes/no Irish re-unification poll results excluding non-standard questions such as those that may refer to additional factors. The phrasing of the question asked in the polls varies.

Notes

The Good Friday Agreement states that "the Secretary of State" should call a referendum "if at any time it appears likely to him that a majority of those voting would express a wish that Northern Ireland should cease to be part of the United Kingdom and form part of a united Ireland."

Non standard questions

Public opinion

Northern Ireland

Historically, opinion polls of the Northern Ireland population consistently showed majorities opposed to a United Ireland and in support of Northern Ireland remaining part of the United Kingdom. For example, in a November 2015 survey by RTÉ and the BBC, 30% of the population expressed support for a United Ireland in their lifetime with 43% opposed and 27% undecided. However, when asked about the status of Northern Ireland in the short-to-medium term, support for unity was lower at around 13% of the population. The 2013 annual Northern Ireland Life and Times survey conducted by the Queen's University Belfast and Ulster University found that a united Ireland was the favoured long term option of 15% of the population while remaining part of the United Kingdom was the favoured long term option of 66% of the population. When the same survey was carried out in 2015, support was 22%.

In 1973, the population of Northern Ireland was granted a referendum on whether Northern Ireland should remain part of the United Kingdom or join with the Republic of Ireland to form a united Ireland. The result was 98.9% in favour of union with the rest of the UK, but the poll was overwhelmingly boycotted by nationalists, and the turnout was therefore 58.7%. The pro-UK vote did however represent 57.5% of the entire electorate, notwithstanding the boycott. Provisions for future referendums were included in the Good Friday Agreement and the Northern Ireland Act 1998.

Many Unionist Protestants in Northern Ireland argue they have a distinct identity that would be overwhelmed in a united Ireland. They cite the decline of the small Protestant population of the Republic of Ireland since independence from the United Kingdom, the economic cost of unification, their place in a key international player within the UK and their mainly non-Irish ancestry. Unionist people in Northern Ireland primarily find their cultural and ethnic identity from the Scottish and English planters (colonists), whose descendants can be found in the three counties of Ulster which are governed by the Republic of Ireland. Such individuals celebrate their Scots heritage each year like their counterparts in the other six counties. While Catholics in general consider themselves to be Irish, Protestants generally see themselves as British, as shown by several studies and surveys performed between 1971 and 2006. Many Protestants do not consider themselves as primarily Irish, as many Irish nationalists do, but rather within the context of an Ulster or British identity. A 1999 survey showed that a little over half of Protestants felt "Not at all Irish", while the rest "felt Irish" in varying degrees.

A 2011 survey by Northern Ireland Life and Times found that 52% of Northern Irish Catholic respondents favoured union with Great Britain over a united Ireland. This is despite the fact that most Catholics who vote do so for political parties that are Nationalist.

According to a 2015 opinion poll, 70% expressed a long-term preference of the maintenance of Northern Ireland's membership of the United Kingdom (either directly ruled or with devolved government), while 14% express a preference for membership of a united Ireland. This discrepancy can be explained by the overwhelming preference among Protestants to remain a part of the UK (93%), while Catholic preferences are spread across a number of solutions to the constitutional question including remaining a part of the UK (47%), a united Ireland (32%), Northern Ireland becoming an independent state (4%), and those who "don't know" (16%).

Since the 2016 Brexit vote, support for reunification has increased, with 22% of respondents favourable towards reunification, up from 17% in 2013. 43% of Catholics would now back reunification, up from 35% in 2013. According to this survey, support for a referendum stands at 53% of Catholic respondents, compared to 28% of Protestant respondents.

A poll in May 2017 found that 51% were in favour of holding a referendum on a united Ireland within the next five years.

In October 2017 a poll found that 62 percent were in favour of having a referendum on a united Ireland within the next ten years. The same poll found that 55 percent of those asked would vote to remain within the United Kingdom if a referendum was held tomorrow while 34 percent said they would vote yes and 10 percent were undecided. The poll also asked how those asked would vote in the event of a "hard Brexit" that was bad for Northern Ireland and a "soft Brexit" that was good for Northern Ireland but the undecided were excluded. In the event of the latter 62.84 percent would vote to remain in the UK while 37.14 would vote for a United Ireland. In the case of the former 53.57 percent said they would vote to remain in the United Kingdom while 46.43 would vote to leave it and have a United Ireland.

In December 2017, an opinion poll carried out by LucidTalk on more than 2,000 people saw 48% of respondents willing to vote for a united Ireland if a border poll was held in the event of a hard Brexit, against 45% for maintaining the status quo. 6% of respondents were undecided, and less than 1% of respondents stated that they would not vote.

A Lord Ashcroft poll, with 1,542 people questioned online from 30 August to 2 September 2019, found 46% of the respondents would vote for leaving the Union and joining the Republic of Ireland, and 45% would vote to stay in the UK. The other respondents would not vote or didn't know.

Assorted opinion polls

An opinion poll of 1,089 people conducted by LucidTalk in 2014 around the time of the Scottish referendum posed several questions. On the question of whether or not there should be a border poll, 47% said "yes", 37% "no" and 16% "don't know". On the question, "If a referendum on Irish Unity was called under the Good Friday Agreement would you vote: Yes for unity as soon as possible, Yes for unity in 20 years, or No for Northern Ireland to remain as it is", the results were as follows.

In 2016 an Ipsos MORI poll asked "If there was a referendum on the border tomorrow would you:" and the answers for different regions of Northern Ireland were as follows,

The same poll recorded answers from people in different age groups as follows,

Answers from people of different religious backgrounds were as follows,

A similar LucidTalk poll conducted in May 2017 found that 51% of people would be in favour of a border poll within the next five years while 39% would not and 10% did not know. Respondents were not asked how they would vote in such a poll.

A LucidTalk opinion poll of 1,334 Northern Irish residents conducted in Oct–Nov 2018 found majority support (60%) for Northern Ireland remaining in the United Kingdom if the UK were to remain an EU member state, an even split (48% each) if the UK were to leave the EU on the terms negotiated between the British Government and the EU, and majority support (55%) for Northern Ireland unifying with the Irish republic if the UK left the EU under a no-deal scenario.

In the Republic of Ireland

There are some very small pressure groups in the Republic of Ireland, such as the Reform Group and lodges of the Orange Order, that are sympathetic to Northern Ireland remaining within the United Kingdom for the foreseeable future, but their impact on the broader political opinion is negligible. A minority of politically conservative Catholic writers from the Republic of Ireland, such as Mary Kenny and Desmond Fennell have expressed misgivings about a united Ireland, fearing the incorporation of a large number of Protestants would threaten what they see as the Catholic nature of the Republic. A Red C/Sunday Times poll in 2010 found that 57% are in favour of a united Ireland, 22% say they are opposed, while 21% are undecided.

In October 2015 an opinion poll commissioned by RTÉ and the BBC and carried out by Behaviour & Attitudes asked those in the Republic of Ireland the question "There are a number of possible options for the constitutional status of Northern Ireland. In the short to medium term, do you think Northern Ireland should..." with the following responses,

The same poll also asked "Thinking of the long-term policy for Northern Ireland, would you like to see a united Ireland in your lifetime?" with the following responses,

The poll then asked a further question concerning the influence of the tax consequences of a united Ireland on support for it,

In December 2016 RTÉ's Claire Byrne Live/ Amárach Research panel asked 'Is it time for a united Ireland?' Forty-six percent of those asked said yes while 32% said no and 22% said that they didn't know. Support was highest among those aged 25–34 with 54% saying yes.

In May 2019 an RTÉ/REDC exit poll at the 2019 elections found that 65% of respondents are in favour of a united Ireland, whereas 19% were against it.

An Irish Times/Ipsos MRBI poll published in December 2021, indicated broad support for Irish unity in the Republic of Ireland, with 62% saying they would vote in favour, while just 16% opposed and 13% saying they don't know. 8% say they would not vote.

In Great Britain 
A 2019 poll by Ipsos Mori and King's College London asked people in Britain (England, Scotland, and Wales): "If there were to be a referendum in Northern Ireland on its future, would you personally prefer Northern Ireland to choose to stay in the UK or leave the UK and join the Republic of Ireland?" The responses revealed that 36% wanted Northern Ireland to stay in the UK, 19% wanted it to join the Republic, 36% had no preference, and 9% were undecided. It further revealed that support for Northern Ireland remaining in the UK was highest among those who intended to vote Conservative (49%) compared to 35% for Labour voters and 31% for Liberal Democrat voters.

See also

Demography of Northern Ireland
Politics of Northern Ireland
Irish nationalism
Protestant Irish nationalists
 Scottish independence
 Welsh independence
 English independence
 Northern Irish independence
 Potential breakup of the United Kingdom

References

Further reading

Geoffrey Bell, Troublesome Business: the Labour Party and the Irish Question. Pluto Press, London 1982. 
Ronan Fanning, Independent Ireland. Helicon, Dublin, 1983.
Bob Rowthorn and Naomi Wayne, Northern Ireland: The Political Economy of Conflict. Polity Press, Cambridge, 1988. 
Daltún Ó Ceallaigh, Labour, Nationalism and Irish Freedom. Léirmheas, Dublin, 1991. 
Vincent J. Delacy Ryan, Ireland Restored: The New Self-Determination. Freedom House, New York, 1991. 
David McKittrick, Through the Minefield. Belfast, Blackstaff Press, 1999. 
Patrick J. Roche and Brian Barton, The Northern Ireland Question : Nationalism, Unionism and Partition Ashgate, Aldershot, 1999. 
Catherine O'Donnell, Fianna Fáil, Irish Republicanism and the Northern Ireland Troubles, 1968–2005. Irish Academic Press, Dublin, 2007. 
Richard Humphreys, Countdown to Unity : Debating Irish Reunification. Irish Academic Press, Dublin, 2008. 
Kevin Meagher, A United Ireland: Why Unification Is Inevitable and How It Will Come About, Biteback Publishing, 2016. 

Celtic nationalism
Irish republicanism
 
Ireland
Northern Ireland peace process
Politics of Northern Ireland
Politics of the Republic of Ireland
Proposed political unions
Public policy proposals